United States gubernatorial elections were held in 1956, in 30 states, concurrent with the House, Senate elections and presidential election, on November 6, 1956 (September 10 in Maine). The special election in Oregon was due to the death of incumbent governor Paul L. Patterson on January 31.

This was the last time Colorado, Maine, and Ohio elected their governors to 2-year terms, all switching to 4-years from the 1958 election.

Results

See also 
1956 United States elections
1956 United States presidential election
1956 United States Senate elections
1956 United States House of Representatives elections

Notes

References 

 
November 1956 events in the United States